Central Kuki-Chin is a branch of the Kuki-Chin languages. Central Kuki-Chin languages are spoken primarily in Mizoram, India and in Hakha Township and Falam Township of Chin State, Myanmar.

Official use
Mizo is the official language of Mizoram State, India.

See also
Lai languages

References

Peterson, David. 2017. "On Kuki-Chin subgrouping." In Picus Sizhi Ding and Jamin Pelkey, eds. Sociohistorical linguistics in Southeast Asia: New horizons for Tibeto-Burman studies in honor of David Bradley, 189-209. Leiden: Brill.
VanBik, Kenneth. 2009. Proto-Kuki-Chin: A Reconstructed Ancestor of the Kuki-Chin Languages. STEDT Monograph 8. .